The Triptych is the third full-length album by metalcore band Demon Hunter, released October 25, 2005. Produced by Aaron Sprinkle (Emery, Fair) and mixed by Machine (Lamb of God), The Triptych had three different album covers—implying a traditional triptych—by Dan Seagrave.

The album hit the No. 1 position on the Billboards Heatseekers chart during its first week of release in stores, with 6.000 copies sold, and was re-released on October 31, 2006.

Vocalist Ryan Clark described in an interview that, while the previous two albums had him record vocals with a standing, screened microphone, for The Triptych, he used a basic handheld mic. This allowed him to move around freely and hold longer notes; however, it also allowed Clark to naturally cup the mic which consequently muffled or distanced his vocals.

Critical reception

The album received generally positive views and was a huge commercial success, reaching No 10. in the Top Christian Albums chart in 2005 and the No. 1 spot on the Top Heatseekers chart in 2006. Eduardo Rivadavia from AllMusic gave the album 4 1/2 out of 5 stars, saying "Christian metal has enjoyed startlingly infrequent success stories over the years." Kaj Roth from Melodic.net gave the album 4 out of 5 stars, stating "This is a numetal monster of a record, what you possibly can ask for in a mega heavy record with all from a gigantic rhythm section to murderous riffs, roars of anger and blockbuster choruses . It is all here in this package called "The triptych", [sic] this really came as a surprise to me since I wasn't too impressed with Demon Hunter's previous album "Summer of Darkness" [sic]. It was a bit non-melodic and contained more growls than melodic vocals but this time, the vocals is more balanced and the band has also written better songs - you could say they have grown from medium size to X-large."

Track listing

Charts

Credits
Demon Hunter
 Ryan Clark — vocals
 Don Clark — rhythm guitar
 Ethan Luck — lead guitar
 Jon Dunn — bass guitar
 Timothy "Yogi" Watts — drums

Production and additional musicians
 Aaron Sprinkle — producer, additional keyboards, programming
 Lars Katz — additional guitars and assisting
 Mixed by Machine
 Recorded at Compound Recording, Seattle, Washington
 Cover paintings by Dan Seagrave
 Art direction by Asterisk Studio

Singles/Videos

"Undying" - the first single and video from The Triptych. The video was directed by Christopher Sims (Bleeding Through, As I Lay Dying, Kutless, Lamb of God). The song is featured on X2007.
"One Thousand Apologies" - the second single and video, directed by Darren Doane (Deftones, Thursday, Every Time I Die, Sinai Beach). The song is featured on X2006.
"Not I" - the final single on the CD however there was no video.
"Snap Your Fingers, Snap Your Neck" - a cover song, originally written and performed by Prong, from the album Cleansing.

From the official website (February 18, 2006): "We can't tell you how humbled we've been by the outpouring of support from the Armed Forces. 'The Soldier's Song' is for them and the letters, photos and friendship continues. SPC Davis, SPC Peterson and SSGT Childs in Iraq, Specialist Graham who served in the Airborne in Iraq and Afghanistan, Paxton in the Air Force, and Warrant Officer Slagle are just a few of the men and women who are true HUNTERS out there sacrificing everyday, risking life and limb and often paying the ultimate price."

Deluxe edition

On October 31, 2006, The Triptych was rereleased with four exclusive tracks and a DVD with footage from a live show in LA, behind the scene documentaries, studio footage, interviews with the band on the road, miscellaneous live footage from the tour, and the videos for "One Thousand Apologies", "Undying", "Not Ready to Die", and "Infected". The four exclusive tracks are:
"My Throat Is An Open Grave (acoustic)" - 3:21
"My Heartstrings Come Undone (acoustic)" - 4:07
"The Tide Began To Rise (acoustic)" - 5:23
"Undying (Wild Boar remix)" - 4:12

DVD live show from the Glasshouse in Pomona, California
 "Intro / The Flame That Guides Us Home"
 "Not I"
 "Ribcage"
 "Screams of the Undead"
 "One Thousand Apologies"
 "Not Ready to Die"
 "The Soldier's Song"
 "I Play Dead"
 "Fire to My Soul" (featuring Dave Peters of Throwdown)
 "Infected"
 "Undying"
 "Through the Black"
 "My Heart Strings Come Undone"
 "Beheaded"

References

External links
The Third War- Album Promotion Site

Demon Hunter albums
2005 albums
Solid State Records albums
Albums produced by Aaron Sprinkle
Albums with cover art by Dan Seagrave